Match It is an Australian children's game show airing on the Seven Network on 4 June 2012, later on 7TWO in 2013, presented by Jack Yabsley. Two teams of primary school students compete on touchscreen 'pods', matching pairs of clues such as flags, photos, faces, and words. The fastest team, with the best memory wins.
Each half hour episode sees four different rounds – Four In Your Face. Tag Team. Sound Round. Flash-Match and the nail-biting Mega-Match – with the successful team up for the chance to play for the title of weekly winner. The series’ top eight teams will then battle it out in finals week for the chance to become ‘Match It’ champions and win a prize for their school.
The studio game-show sees teams of Year Six school-kids using touch-screen technology and smartphone-style icons to match up multiple-choice answers to an array of questions – from pets to pop culture, sport, space and beyond.

Winners
Smart Puppies won season 2 on July 24, 2013.

the Marvellous Midgets (Elliott Merryweather, Natalie Hooper & Bridget Spencer) won season 3 on 6 September 2013.

The Big Thinkers (Christopher, Tegan & Luke) defeated the Rocket Racers (Priscilla, Tilly & Spencer) by 360-300.

References

7two original programming
Australian children's game shows
2012 Australian television series debuts
2014 Australian television series endings
2010s Australian game shows
Australian children's television series
English-language television shows
Student quiz television series
Television shows set in Sydney